The Hallé is an English symphony orchestra based in Manchester, England. It supports a choir, youth choir, youth training choir, children's choir and a youth orchestra, and releases its recordings on its own record label, though it has occasionally released recordings on Angel Records and EMI.  Since 1996, the orchestra has been resident at the Bridgewater Hall in Manchester.

History

In May 1857, the pianist and conductor Charles Hallé set up an orchestra to perform at the Manchester Art Treasures Exhibition, which it did until October.  Hallé decided to continue working with the orchestra as a formal organisation, and it gave its first concert under those auspices on 30 January 1858.  The orchestra's first home was the Free Trade Hall. By 1861 the orchestra was in financial trouble, and it performed only two concerts that year. In 1888 German violinist Willy Hess become leader of The Hallé, a role he held until 1895. From its opening in 1893 he was also the principal professor of violin at the Royal Manchester College of Music.

 Hans Richter served as music director from 1899 to 1911. During his tenure, the orchestra gave the first performance of the Symphony No. 1 of Sir Edward Elgar.

In 1943 the orchestra was again in crisis, having diminished in size to 30 players.  Over the next 27 years, from 1943 to 1970, the orchestra's next music director, Sir John Barbirolli, restored the Hallé to national prominence. On 3 February 1946 The Hallé Orchestra and Chorus (conducted by John Barbirolli) performed Aida at Belle Vue, Manchester. In addition to playing in all parts of the UK, in these years the orchestra visited Germany, Austria, Holland, Czechoslovakia, Poland, Spain, Portugal, Southern Rhodesia, Yugoslavia, Turkey, Italy, Greece, Switzerland, France, Scandinavia, Central and Southern America and the West Indies. Together, they made many recordings, including the first recording of Ralph Vaughan Williams' Symphony No. 8, of which they also gave the first performance.  During Barbirolli's tenure, one of the most notable orchestra members was concertmaster Martin Milner, who served in that capacity from 1958 to 1987.  Barbirolli regarded Milner as his "right-hand man" and once wrote in appreciation to him: "You are the finest leader I have ever had in my fairly long career."

Kent Nagano was principal conductor of the orchestra from 1992 to 1999.  The orchestra moved from the Free Trade Hall to the Bridgewater Hall in 1996 as its primary concert venue.  During his tenure, Nagano received criticism for his expensive and ambitious programming, as well as his conducting fees.  However, poor financial management at the orchestra separately contributed to the fiscal troubles of the orchestra. The orchestra faced major financial problems during the late 1990s, including a £1.3 million deficit in 1998, to the point where the existence of the orchestra was threatened with loss of funding from the Arts Council and ultimately bankruptcy.

During 1997 there was an eight-month period when the orchestra had no executive director.  Leslie Robinson served for two years as chief executive after that period, starting changes to the orchestra to start to bring under control the orchestra's financial troubles.  These included public fund-raising, which netted £2 million, cutting the number of people on the orchestra board in half, and reducing the number of musicians in the orchestra from 98 to 80. 

In 1999, John Summers became the orchestra's chief executive, and continued Robinson's fiscal practices to restore greater financial security to the orchestra. In 2001, the Arts Council awarded the orchestra a £3.8 million grant to allow it to pay off accumulated debts and increase musician salaries, which had been frozen for 4 years.

In September 2000, Sir Mark Elder took up the position of music director, having been appointed to the post in 1999. His concerts with the orchestra have received consistently positive reviews, and he is generally regarded as having restored the orchestra to high critical and musical standards.  In 2004 Elder signed a contract to extend his tenure through 2010,  and in May 2009 the Hallé announced a further extension to 2015.  In November 2013, the Hallé announced the further extension of Elder's contract through "at least 2020".

One of the orchestra's ideas was to try to find alternative stage dress to the traditional "penguin suits", but this idea did not come to fruition.  The orchestra has also begun to issue new CD recordings under its own label. In 2017, the orchestra began a series of recordings in collaboration with the film composer, Benson Taylor.

In March 2006, the orchestra was forced to cancel a planned tour of the United States because of the cost and administrative difficulties in obtaining visas for the musicians, a result of the tougher visa regulations intended to combat potential terrorist attacks.

The orchestra appointed its first-ever principal guest conductor, Cristian Mandeal, in 2006.  He served in this post until 2009.  In February 2008, the orchestra announced the appointment of Markus Stenz as its second and next principal guest conductor, starting in 2009. Past assistant conductors have included Edward Gardner, Rory Macdonald, Andrew Gourlay, and Ewa Strusińska (2008–2010), the first female conductor named to a UK assistant conductorship.  In September 2016, Jonathon Heyward became the Hallé's new assistant conductor, whose duties include musical direction of the Hallé Youth Orchestra.  The current leader of the Hallé is Roberto Ruisi.  The orchestra's current head of artistic planning is Anna Hirst.

Summers retired as chief executive in July 2020.  The orchestra's current chief executive is David Butcher, who was named to the post in February 2020 and assumed the post in July 2020.  In February 2023, Elder stated his intention to stand down as music director of the orchestra at the close of the 2023-2024 season.

Notable premieres

Ensembles
Along with the Hallé Orchestra, the Hallé Concerts Society also supports a number of ensembles.

Hallé Choir 

The Hallé Choir was founded with the orchestra in 1858 by Sir Charles Hallé. The choir gives around ten concerts a year with the Hallé at The Bridgewater Hall and other venues across the UK. The current Hallé Choir Director is Matthew Hamilton.

Hallé Youth Orchestra
The Hallé Youth Orchestra was founded in 2002, with Edward Gardner as their first conductor. The HYO regularly work with members of the Hallé Orchestra through workshops, and each summer undertake a tour.

Hallé Youth Choir 
The Hallé Youth Choir was founded in 2003 for singers aged 13–19 years.

Hallé Children's Choir 
The Hallé Children's Choir is a choir for singers aged 8–12, intended as an introduction to singing at the highest level.

Principal conductors

Venues
The Hallé performs about 70 concerts a year in Manchester's Bridgewater Hall, opened in 1996.

Hallé St Peter's is a former church in Ancoats which was converted for the orchestra to use for rehearsals, recordings, and small performances, and as a base for the choirs and Youth Orchestra. It was opened in 2013 by Sophie, Countess of Wessex.

Hallé at St Michael's is another converted church, used as a space for artistic and educational activities and community events.

References

Bibliography
 Kennedy, Michael (1982) The Hallé, 1858–1983: a History of the Orchestra. Manchester: Manchester University Press,

External links

  The Hallé official website

1858 establishments in England
Organizations established in 1858
Arts organizations established in 1858
British symphony orchestras
English orchestras
Musical groups established in 1858
Musical groups from Manchester
Organisations based in Manchester
Organisations based in Greater Manchester
Charities based in Manchester
Charities based in Greater Manchester
Culture in Manchester
Erato Records artists